The 1966–67 Wisconsin Badgers men's basketball team represented University of Wisconsin–Madison in the 1966–67 NCAA Division I men's basketball season as members of the Big Ten Conference. The head coach was John Erickson, coaching his eighth season with the Badgers. The team played their home games at the Wisconsin Field House (commonly known as the UW Fieldhouse) in Madison, Wisconsin. They finished the season 13–11, 8–6 in Big Ten play to finish in fourth place.

Schedule and results

|-
!colspan=12 style=| Regular season

References

External links
Wisconsin Badgers Basketball History 

Wisconsin Badgers men's basketball seasons
Wisconsin
Wisconsin Badgers men's basketball
Wisconsin Badgers men's basketball